Talk 'n Play was an American interactive desktop educational toy book reader with a built in microphone and action buttons that was sold from 1983 to 1992 as an entertaining and educational toy manufactured by Hasbro. It appears to work utilizing the two sets of right/left tracts to have the "interactive" mono audio segments. It then also provided a record capability so as a child could ad in their own voice and create interactions with characters on the program. It was invented and Patented by Michael J. Freeman Ph.D. and licensed for use by the Children's Television Workshop (owners of Sesame Street) and the Walt Disney Company, among others (see list below). Similar to adapted 4 channels of educational information (and recordings from the child) to produce interactivity, but the main voices were created and produced by Sesame Street and Disney characters under License. Because the toy contained an integrative book reader, some   considered it an early lower tech version of the kindle.  Talk'N play would say turn the page now. Story programs were produced by others Talk'N Play had many music programs where children could add in or take out, different instruments as the song is played.

Talk 'n Play was considered 'way ahead of its time' because it was the first of this genre of educational toys that allowed children to directly interact with famous characters, via Freeman's system. Talk 'N Play also won five awards for excellence in product design.

History
First manufactured by CBS Toys under the brand name Child Guidance in 1984 as Electronic Talk 'n Play. It was later produced by Hasbro under the brand name Playskool in 1986 as Talk 'n Play. A smaller "portable" unit was also released under the Playskool brand name. Other non related items have been released from Hasbro bearing the mark Talk 'n Play.

Book/cassette tape sets
 An Adventure With Mother Goose
 Animals and Their Babies
 The Reading Robot: A First Reading Program 
 Can You Tell Me How to Get to Sesame Street? (included with new Talk 'n Play units)
 Lovable, Furry Old Grover in Please Don't Push the Red Button
 A Silly Sesame Street Story: The Three Little Pigs
 Big Bird's Alphabet Book  
 Let's Play School
 Bert and Ernie's Band
 The Muppets: Opening Day at Peppermint Park
 The Muppets: The Great Treasure Hunt
 Fraggle Rock: The Great Fraggle Travel Race
 In Search of the Planet Cobalt
 Animal Rock Band
 Mickey Mouse Circle M for Math
 The Computer Apprentice
 Cookie Monster Cookies for Sale
 The Haunted House Mystery
 It's a Hello Kitty World
 Alvin and The Chipmunks in Concert
 The Amazing Facts Game Show
 Goofy's Sports Coaching Tips
 The Monster Lover's Club
 Jokes, Riddles, Gags, and Giggles
 Terry the Triceratops
 Lady and the Tramp in the New Baby
 Puzzles and Games
 Blast Off!
 Inspector Gadget and the Weather Station Caper
 Mickey's Treasure Hunt
 Beauty Finds The Beast

References

Products introduced in 1984
Toy brands
1980s toys
Hasbro products
Educational toys
Electronic toys